Royal Prussian Jagdstaffel 90, commonly abbreviated to Jasta 90, was a "hunting group" (i.e., fighter squadron) of the Luftstreitkräfte, the air arm of the Imperial German Army during World War I.

History
Jasta 90 was founded on 28 or 29 October 1918. Its predecessor was Kampfeinsitzerstaffeln ("Scout Detachments") 1a and 1b. The new squadron never became operational.

References

Bibliography
 

90
Military units and formations established in 1918
1918 establishments in Germany
Military units and formations disestablished in 1918